The 2001 Brisbane Sevens, officially the 2001 Brisbane International Sevens, was a cancelled international rugby sevens tournament, originally scheduled to be part of the second season of the World Sevens Series in 2000-01. The International Rugby Board (IRB) withdrew the World Series hosting rights in response to the Australian government's sporting sanctions against Fiji.

The Australian federal government had refused to provide visas to the Fijian 7s squad following the Fiji military coup which had taken place in May 2000.

The statement from the IRB in response said:

The event had been planned to be held in Brisbane on the weekend of 16–17 February 2001, but was cancelled. It would have been the 2nd edition of the Australian Sevens tournament but that had to wait for the 2002 Brisbane Sevens in the 2001-02 season.

References

Australian Sevens
Brisbane Sevens
2000–01 IRB Sevens World Series